Vishal Om Prakash (aka Vishal O Sharma) is an Indian actor. He has acted in over 50 films in Hindi, Tamil and Telugu films. His notable roles have included Kumar Deepak in the award winning  Peepli Live.

Personal life
Vishal O Sharma was born in Lucknow, India. He did his initial schooling in Gujarat and then moved to Lucknow where he studied at the Spring Dale School.

Filmography

Peepli Live as Kumar Deepak
Aasma (completed) as Nazeer (as Vishal Sharma)
Ek Bura Aadmi (completed) as Captain Ganesh (as Vishal Sharma) 
Bhawani Mandi Tesan
2016 Lucknow Times as Fatey Singh
2015/II India's Daughter as Vishal
2013 Jolly LLB  as Lawyer (as Vishal Sharma)
2011 Looteri Dulhan TV series, as Diamond Singh 
2010 Peepli Live  as Kumar Deepak (as Vishal Sharma) 
2008 My Name Is Anthony Gonsalves as Shiraj Bhai (as Vishal Sharma)
2007 Jab We Met as Aditya's lawyer (as Vishal Sharma) 
2007 Laaga Chunari Mein Daag Journey of a Woman as Doctor Ghosh (uncredited)
2004 Veer-Zaara (as Vishal Sharma)
2004 Love in Nepal as Negi (as Vishal Sharma)

References

External links

Living people
Indian male film actors
Indian male television actors
Year of birth missing (living people)